WGYE is a Country formatted broadcast radio station licensed to Mannington, West Virginia, serving North-Central West Virginia.  WGYE is owned and operated by Burbach Broadcasting Company.

History

This radio station first began as WTUS, and was assigned these call letters on October 31, 1989, more than a year after the construction permit was first granted in May 1988.  However, the permit was sold to Joseph Donald Powers and partner Al Sergi in 1991 for $23,000.

Powers and Sergi finally brought the station on the air in the fall of 1992, with the moniker "Today's U.S. Country", maintaining studios and offices along Locust Avenue in neighboring Fairmont, where the station remains today.

Powers and Sergi sold WTUS in the late 1990s to Pittsburgh-based Burbach Broadcasting, which still owns the station today.  Sergi today owns WSGB in Sutton, West Virginia, and three other area stations.

The station has had a country format for its entire existence.

Translator
WGYE also simulcasts on a 220-watt translator station W280FF, which transmits on 103.9 MHz. W280FF is licensed to and serves Morgantown, West Virginia.

External links
 Froggy Country Online
 
 
 

GYE
GYE
Radio stations established in 1992